David Fernández Cortázar (born 6 April 1985 in Madrid) is a Spanish professional footballer who plays for UD Logroñés as a central defender.

Honours
Oviedo
Segunda División B: 2014–15

References

External links

1985 births
Living people
Spanish footballers
Footballers from Madrid
Association football defenders
Segunda División players
Segunda División B players
Tercera División players
Primera Federación players
Rayo Vallecano B players
Atlético Madrid B players
CD Linares players
CD Guadalajara (Spain) footballers
Real Oviedo players
AD Alcorcón footballers
UD Logroñés players